JooYoung Choi is a Houston-based Korean American multidisciplinary visual artist working with paintings, sculpture, and video to portray the mythology of a fictional world called the Cosmic Womb.

Personal life 

Choi was born in Seoul, South Korea in 1982, immigrating to Concord, New Hampshire through adoption in the early 1980s. She earned her undergraduate degree from the Massachusetts College of Art and Design and her M.F.A. in Visual Art from the Art Institute of Boston.

Work 
Choi's work includes soft sculptures, puppets, paintings, animation, and video art. Her first puppets were created in 2015 during a residency at Lawndale Art Center, while also working to develop her skills as a painter and finding a love for visually balanced dynamic compositions.

Cosmic Womb 
The Cosmic Womb is a paracosm with its own characters and mythology, with the motto "Have Faith, for You've Always Been Loved." It is a way of exploring aspects of her own identity and her experiences with adoption, offering ways for Choi to step into the roles of different characters. The Cosmic Womb is governed by an earthling from Concord (the city of her childhood) named C.S. Watson, alongside the Tuplets, who are six humanoids with special powers, and Queen Kiok.

Selected awards 

 National Endowment for the Arts, Challenge America grant recipient, 2019
The Idea Fund, Round Eleven Stimulus grant, 2019
Mayor’s Office of Cultural Affairs and Houston Arts Alliance, Support for Artist and Creative Individuals grant, 2019
Riverfest Artist-in-Residence, 2018
The Idea Fund, Round Eight Spark grant, 2016
Artadia Fund for Art and Dialogue, Artadia Award, 2015

References

External links 
 Official Website

Living people
American women painters
American women sculptors
American people of Korean descent
American women installation artists
American installation artists
21st-century American women artists
Massachusetts College of Art and Design alumni
American sculptors
1982 births
American contemporary painters